Wojciech Lisowski (born 10 February 1992) is a Polish professional footballer who plays as a right-back for Pogoń Szczecin II.

External links

References

1992 births
Living people
Association football defenders
Polish footballers
Ekstraklasa players
I liga players
III liga players
Legia Warsaw players
Legia Warsaw II players
Pogoń Szczecin players
Piast Gliwice players
Chojniczanka Chojnice players
GKS Katowice players
People from Stargard
Sportspeople from West Pomeranian Voivodeship